Friedrich Straetmanns (born 5 August 1961) is a German politician. Born in Bielefeld, North Rhine-Westphalia, he has represented The Left. Friedrich Straetmanns served as a member of the Bundestag from the state of North Rhine-Westphalia from 2017 to 2021.

Life 
After completing his military service, Friedrich Straetmanns studied law and political science from 1982 to 1989, including a traineeship. Afterwards he worked as a lawyer for a short time and then at the Diakonisches Werk until 1992. He then became a judge at the Social Court of Detmold. He became member of the bundestag after the 2017 German federal election. He is a member of the Committee for Legal Affairs and Consumer Protection and the Committee for the Examination of Elections.

References

External links 

 Bundestag biography 

1961 births
Living people
Members of the Bundestag for North Rhine-Westphalia
Members of the Bundestag 2017–2021
Members of the Bundestag for The Left